Dodë Tahiri (27 November 1918 – 28 May 1988) was an Albanian international football player. He was the goalkeeper in Albania's first ever international match against Yugoslavia in 1946.

Club career
Born in Pecaj, Dukagjin highlands, Tahiri came to Lazarevac, Serbia, in 1938 to play for Bashan. Named after his place of birth, he played in Serbia as Doda Pecović. He later played for FK Šumadija Aranđelovac in Serbia during the 1930s and 1950s. At the end of the Second World War he played with Vllaznia Shkodër in Albania winning two league titles. Then he played with FK Budućnost Titograd in the 1946–47 and 1948–49 Yugoslav First League.

International career
He made a total of 3 appearances for the Albania national team in 1946 in Tirana within the 1946 Balkan Cup, the first against Yugoslavia (2–3 defeat) and the second against Bulgaria (3–1 win).

Honours
Albanian Superliga: 2
 1945, 1946

References

1918 births
1988 deaths
People from Shkodër
Association football goalkeepers
Albanian footballers
Albania international footballers
KF Vllaznia Shkodër players
FK Budućnost Podgorica players
FK Šumadija Aranđelovac players
Yugoslav First League players
Albanian expatriate footballers
Expatriate footballers in Yugoslavia
Albanian expatriate sportspeople in Yugoslavia
Albanian football managers